Crepidium binabayense is a member of the family Orchidaceae, endemic to the Philippines.

Distribution and habitat 

Found on Samar Island and Mindoro Island of the Philippines.

References

External links
 

binabayense
Endemic orchids of the Philippines